Robert Felix and Elma Taylor Wichterich House, also known as the Wichterich-Lang House, is a historic home located at Cape Girardeau, Missouri.  It was built in 1906, and is a -story, brick dwelling with Colonial Revival style design elements.  It features a fine wraparound verandah with Ionic order capitals and a pedimented gable with a Palladian window.

It was listed on the National Register of Historic Places in 1999. It is located in the Courthouse-Seminary Neighborhood Historic District.

References

Individually listed contributing properties to historic districts on the National Register in Missouri
Houses on the National Register of Historic Places in Missouri
Colonial Revival architecture in Missouri
Houses completed in 1906
Houses in Cape Girardeau County, Missouri
National Register of Historic Places in Cape Girardeau County, Missouri
1906 establishments in Missouri